The Museum of the Year Award, formerly known as the Gulbenkian Prize and the Art Fund Prize, is an annual prize awarded to a museum or gallery in the United Kingdom for a "track record of imagination, innovation and excellence". The award of £100,000 is Britain's biggest single art prize, and the largest single museum arts prize in the world. The prize and is presented to a museum or gallery, large or small, anywhere in the UK, whose entry, in the opinion of the judges, best demonstrates a track record of imagination, innovation and excellence through work mainly undertaken during the previous calendar year.

History
The Museum of the Year was awarded by the British charity National Heritage from 1973 to 2000. In 2001, the Museum Prize Trust was established with the aim of creating a single award to replace this prize and three others awarded by the Museums Association, the Art Fund and the Campaign for Museums. The Gulbenkian Prize, as this was known, was first awarded in 2003. The prize's principal sponsor until 2007 was the Lisbon-based Calouste Gulbenkian Foundation, but since 2008 it has been sponsored by the Art Fund. It adopted its current name in late 2012, and the first award under the new name was given in 2013.

Since 2011 the Clore Award for Museum Learning, worth £10,000 and sponsored by the Clore Duffield Foundation, has been awarded for "quality museum and gallery learning with children and young people (from early years up to the age of 25) in any setting, in or out of school or college". For its first two years this award had a separate shortlist but in 2013 it was awarded to an institution on the Museum of the Year shortlist, which had expanded from four to ten finalists.

List of winners and shortlisted entries

National Heritage Museum of the Year (1973–2000)

Gulbenkian Prize (2003–2007)

Art Fund Prize (2008–2012)

Art Fund Museum of the Year (2013–)

See also

 List of awards for contributions to culture
 European Museum of the Year Award
 Europa Nostra
 The Best in Heritage

References

External links
 
 The Museum Prize Trust

Awards established in 2003
 
Museum awards
Annual events in the United Kingdom
2003 establishments in the United Kingdom